Letov is an aircraft company located in Letňany, Prague, Czech Republic. It is the oldest aircraft company in the region.

History
Letov was founded in 1918 by the Czechoslovak Ministry of Defense to repair World War I trophy planes. The first indigenous aircraft, the Letov Š-1, was designed and built in 1920, and some 50 aircraft types were built by 1939. During World War II the factory served as repair shop for the German Luftwaffe. Production lines were also set up during World War II for combat versions of the Ju 290 aircraft, commencing with the Ju 290 A-2, which carried a search radar for its patrol role. Since the 1950s, the plant has manufactured parts for the MiG-15, MiG-19 and MiG-21.

Over 4,000 wings and empennages for L-29 Delfín, a jet trainer aircraft that became the standard jet trainer for the air forces Warsaw Pact nations in the 1960s, were built by Letov. The company has also built wings and empennages for 2500 L-39 Albatros trainer aircraft since the 1970s.

Following the fall of socialism in Czechoslovakia in 1989, Letov failed to assert itself on the international market and in 2000 it was bought by French Groupe Latécoère. The company now manufactures parts for large passenger aircraft.

Aircraft

See also
 Aero Vodochody
 Avia
 Beneš-Mráz
 Let Kunovice
 Zlin Aircraft

References

Notes

Bibliography

External links

Aircraft manufacturers of the Czech Republic and Czechoslovakia
Manufacturing companies based in Prague
Vehicle manufacturing companies established in 1918
Czech brands
1918 establishments in Czechoslovakia